Orsolya is a Hungarian variant of Ursula meaning "little bear" or "bear cub", derived from a diminutive form of the Latin word ursa "she-bear". Saint Ursula was a legendary virgin princess of the 4th century who was martyred by the Huns while returning from a pilgrimage. Today the story of Saint Ursula is overwhelmingly considered to be fiction. In England the saint was popular during the Middle Ages, and the name came into general use at that time.

Famous Hungarian females who share the same given name:

Orsolya Dersffy (1583–1619), Hungarian noblewoman
Orsolya Drozdik (born 1946), Hungarian feminist visual artist 
Orsolya Herr (born 1984), Hungarian handball player
Orsolya Karalyos (born 1991), Hungarian handball player
Orsolya Kasó (born 1988), Hungarian female water polo goalkeeper
Orsolya Kocsis (born 1984),  Hungarian fashion, glamour model
Orsolya Nagy (born 1977), Hungarian fencer
Orsolya Szegedi (born 1989), Hungarian handball player
Orsolya Takács (born 1985), Hungarian water polo player
Orsolya Tóth (born 1981), Hungarian actress
Orsolya Vérten (born 1982), Hungarian handball player

References 

Hungarian feminine given names